V.R. Raghava Krishna (born 1987) is a Carnatic music vocalist from Chennai, India. Hailing from a family with a rich music tradition, he was exposed to the south 
Indian classical music at an early age.

He has been performing in various sabhas in and outside of Chennai. Notably, Sri Krishna Gana Sabha, Naada Inbam, Sri Parthasarathy Swamy Sabha, Karthik Fine Arts, Bharat Kalachar,
Kapali Fine Arts, Adambakkam Isai Mandram, Shanmukhananda Sabha (young talent) Bombay,
Guruvaayoorappan Samaj Bangalore, Tamil Isai Sangam, Sathguru Samajam – Madurai, Pollachi, Trichy Rasikaranjani Sabha, Thiruvananthapuram Neelakanta Sivan Festival, Thrippunithura - Poornathrayisa Seva Sangam, Toronto – Naada Laya Foundation Festival and at Kochi, 'Yaksha', music and dance festival by Isha Yoga Center at the Dhyanalinga yogic temple at Velliangiri, near Coimbatore etc.

He concluded his brilliant recital with a brisk and lively Madhuvanti Tillana of Shanmugha Raghavan with swarakshara prayogas.

In September 2013 at his concert, featured by Nadabrahma Gana Sabha in Vanaprastha, Coimbatore, the graphic presentations revealed how he internalised the inner core and fertilised it by intense saadhakam (the way of learning, practising and mastering Carnatic Music).

Other activities

Apart from being a musician he is also a professional animator()  and a magician too.

He learnt 3D Animation & Visual Effects from Vancouver Film School, Canada. He worked with the animation department of the video game Batman: Arkham Origins.

References

1987 births
Living people
Male Carnatic singers
Carnatic singers